Del Norte High School is a public high school located in and primarily serving the 4S Ranch and Del Sur communities of San Diego, California. It is part of the Poway Unified School District (PUSD).

History
Del Norte opened on August 19, 2009, and was the last comprehensive high school to be opened in the Poway Unified School District. 

During its first year, Del Norte was expected to have approximately 700 students in order to create a personalized learning experience. Also notable was the absence of juniors and seniors, as the first year only contained freshmen and sophomores. The expected student population after the first few years was approximately 2,250 students.

On May 13, 2014, the Bernardo Fire broke out near the school, leading to the evacuation of 21,000 nearby houses.

On May 26, 2022, Del Norte High School and several nearby schools in Poway Unified School District were put into complete lockdown because of shooting threats called into the police station. The following day, many students left their homeroom period in a walkout to protest gun violence and honor the lives lost just two days prior during the Robb Elementary School shooting.

Enrollment 
In the 2021-2022 school year, 2,585 students were enrolled at Del Norte, with a senior class of 675 students. Student enrollment in 2020 was reported as 38.4% White, 38.3% Asian, 10.4% Hispanic or Latino, 8.2% two or more races, 1.5% African American, 0.3% Native Hawaiian or Pacific Islander, and 0.2% Native American or Alaska Native.

Campus
The school is modeled after the layout of another PUSD school, Westview High School. The design is a radial pattern, with all buildings linking to a central common area. Del Norte is equipped with technology including a school-wide data-sharing network, VoIP, and Promethean Activboards in all classrooms.

Athletics
The athletic programs that are offered are: sideline cheer, men's water polo, football, girls' field hockey, girls' golf, girls' tennis, girls' volleyball, and cross country in the fall; sideline cheer, basketball, soccer, girls' water polo, wrestling, club roller hockey and club rugby in the winter; competitive cheer, boys' golf, lacrosse, boys' tennis, boys' volleyball, swimming/dive, baseball, softball, girl's gymnastics, and track and field in the spring. Del Norte submitted a California Interscholastic Federation (CIF) membership application for the 2009-2010 year.

Academic Rankings 
In 2022, Niche and U.S. News both ranked Del Norte the 3rd best high school in San Diego area, with U.S. News also ranking Del Norte as the top high school in PUSD.

Notable alumni
 Quenton Meeks - American football cornerback for the Tennessee Titans of the National Football League (NFL)

See also
Primary and secondary schools in San Diego, California

References

External links 
 

High schools in San Diego
Public high schools in California
Educational institutions established in 2009
2009 establishments in California